Derrytresk is a townland outside Coalisland, County Tyrone, Northern Ireland and is close to the shores of Lough Neagh. It is situated in the historic barony of Dungannon Middle and the civil parish of Clonoe and covers an area of 1020 acres. Derrytresk consists of sub-townlands: Derryvarne, Derrykiltena and Derrynahaskila. 

The name derives from the Irish: Doire Triosca (Oak wood of the malt grains or grove of the brewer's grains).

Population
The population of the townland declined during the 19th century:

See also
List of townlands of County Tyrone

References

Townlands of County Tyrone
Civil parish of Clonoe